Prince Teriʻitua Tuavira Joinville Pōmare (17 December 1847 – 9 April 1875), also known as Prince Joinville, was a member of the royal family of Tahiti, the Pōmare dynasty, who lived in the time of the French protectorate of the Kingdom of Tahiti (1842–1880).

Biography 

Tuavira Joinville was the youngest son of Pōmare IV, queen from 1827 to 1877, and of Ari'ifaite a Hiro, Prince consort, first cousin of the queen, and a chief from Huahine. At his birth, he was adopted by the childless Teri'itua, the female chief of the Hitia'a district, who had no children. When she died on 3 June 1849, the infant prince succeeded her and took her title. Because of his age, Teohu, the widower of Teri'itua, ruled as his representative. Matahiapo a Tanoa or Maraetaata later served as his representative in Hitiaa from 1872 to 1875.

At his christening, he was given the name "Joinville" by the French governor, Lavaud, in honor of Prince François, Prince of Joinville, one of the sons of French King Louis Philippe I. The Tahitians translated the given name of "Joinville" as "Tuavira." At a young age, he was able to speak a little of the French language. French governor Dubouzet took Tuavira on his 1856 visit to the French colony in New Caledonia to show him the tastes and habits of the Europeans.

At the age of 15, at his mother's request and with the agreement of the French governor La Richerie, he was sent with a group of six young Polynesian aristocrats to France to finish his education. The students departed Tahiti on 3 November 1862 and arrived in Brest on 25 February 1863 after four months of travel. They lived in France from 1863 to 1865 and acquired a good knowledge of the French language. Despite being Protestants, the Tahitian nobles wee educated by the Brothers of Ploërrnel at the École de Notre Dame de Toutes Aides in Nantes.
He also was a student interpreter for indigenous affairs.

He died at Papeete on 9 April 1875.

Marriage and descendants 

In June 1868, he married Isabelle Vahinetua Shaw (1850–1918), the natural daughter of Captain William Shaw, an Englishman living in Papeete, and Teina a Tohi, a Tahitian from a chiefly family in Mo'orea. Considered an unequal marriage, the union was a great embarrassment for Queen Pōmare IV and the nobles but was accepted by the common people. Isabelle later became the mistress of his elder brother Pōmare V.

This marriage produced one son:
 Teri'ihinoiatua Pōmare, also known as Prince Hinoi (1869–1916), whose descendants still live in French Polynesia.

Ancestry

References

Bibliography 

 

1847 births
1875 deaths
Pōmare dynasty
Sons of monarchs